Oxylabs is a company specializing in web data gathering. It offers proxy solutions which its clients use for various activities related to market research.

The company was founded in 2015 and is currently operating from its headquarters in Lithuania.

Partnerships 
In the past, Oxylabs, being a data gathering company, has partnered with various university researchers on projects aiming to tackle COVID-19 tracking. Partners included representatives of Stanford University, University of Virginia, and Virginia Tech, as well as Lugano university in Switzerland.

References 

Companies established in 2015
2015 establishments in Lithuania
Technology companies established in 2015